Run the Road is a series of compilations released on 679 Recordings and Vice. It is intended to showcase a wide variety of grime artists from the genre such as Dizzee Rascal, Wiley and Kano.

==''Run the Roads musical implications==
Run the Road served as an advertisement to the United States of the various, young, future stars currently performing in the grime scene. Artists such as Lady Sovereign, featured on the track "Cha Ching", despite having some recognition in Britain, still long to gain success in the United States and become an international star. Run the Road features some of the hungriest young stars of the UK and has been described as the "first real showcase of the UK's grime scene."

Run the Road Vol. 1

 Terror Danjah feat. Riko, Bruza, D Double E and Hyper - Cock Back
 Riko and Target - Chosen One
 Roll Deep - Let It Out
 Kano - P's and Q's
 Jammer feat. Wiley, D Double E, Kano and Goodz - Destruction Vip
 Dizzee Rascal feat. D Double E - Give U More
 No Lay - Unorthodox Daughter
 Shystie feat. Ronnie Redz, Kano and Bruza - One Wish (Terror Remix)
 Durrty Goodz - Gimmie Dat
 Demon feat. Big E D - I Wont Change
 Tinchy Stryder - Move
 Lady Sovereign - Cha Ching (Cheq 1-2 Remix)
 Ears - Happy Days
 The Streets Ft. Kano, Donae'o, Lady Sovereign and Tinchy Stryder - Fit But You Know It
 Wonder feat. Plan B - Cap Black
 Kano feat. Demon And Wiley - Mic Fight

Run the Road Vol. 2Disc 1 Big Seac, Demon, Doctor, Ghetto, Kano, Low Deep - Get Set [Run the Road Edition]
 DaVinChe, Doctor - Gotta Man?
 JME - Serious [Run the Road Remix]
 Big Seac - Nah, Nah
 Bigz, Bruza, Pyrelli, Skinnyman, Sway, Triple Threat - Up Your Speed [Remix]
 Ghetto, Katie Pearl - Run the Road
 Plan B - Sick 2 Def [Acoustic]
 Demon, Ghetto, Kano - Mic Check [Remix]
 Lady Sov - Little Bit Of Shuush [DJ Wonder Remix]
 Crazy Titch - Word Is Crazy
 Joe Buhdha, Klashnekoff - Can't You See?
 Earz, JME, Jammer, Mizz Beats, Sier, Wiley - Saw It Comin'
 Trimbal - They Gave an Inch
 No Lay - Unorthodox Chick
 Bear Man, Doctor, Fender - Drink Bear [Remix]
 Dynasty Crew - Bare Face DynastyDisc 2'''
 Kano - P's and Q's [DVD] [Multimedia Track]
 Bear Man - Drinking Beer [DVD] [Multimedia Track]
 Bruza, D Double E, Demon, Kano - Streets [Get Out of My House MC Version] [DVD] [Multimedia Track]
 Who's That Boy [DVD] [Multimedia Track]
 Bonus Material [DVD]

References

Hip hop compilation albums
2005 compilation albums
2006 compilation albums